Hermann Klare (12 May 1909 – 22 August 2003) was a chemistry academic who played a prominent role in scientific administration and research in the German Democratic Republic (GDR).  Klare held professorships at the Technical University Leuna-Merseburg and at Humboldt University (Berlin). From 1968 to 1979 he was president of the German Academy of Sciences (renamed the Academy of Sciences of the GDR in 1972).

Publications 
Technology and chemistry of synthetic polyamide fibers. Berlin 1954
Synthetic polyamide fibers: technology and chemistry. Berlin 1963 (as co-author)
The Academy of Sciences of the GDR: the 275th anniversary of the founding of the Academy. Berlin 1975
History of chemical fiber research to the present. Berlin 1985

References 

1909 births
2003 deaths
20th-century German chemists
East German scientists
Members of the German Academy of Sciences at Berlin